Stenkumla is a populated area, a socken (not to be confused with parish), on the Swedish island of Gotland. It comprises the same area as the administrative Stenkumla District, established on 1January 2016.

Geography 
Stenkumla is the name of the socken as well as the district. It is also the name of the small village surrounding the medieval Stenkumla Church, sometimes referred to as Stenkumla kyrkby. It is situated in the central east part of Gotland.

, Stenkumla Church belongs to Stenkumla parish, along with the churches in Träkumla, Västerhejde and
Vibble.

One of the asteroids in the asteroid belt, 10553 Stenkumla, is named after this place.

History 
The last public execution in Sweden took place at Stenkumla Backe by Stenkumla Church on 18May 1876. Konrad Petterson Lundqvist Tector, a robber and murderer was beheaded. He was buried in the church cemetery where his grave can still be seen.

References

External links 

Objects from Stenkumla at the Digital Museum by Nordic Museum

Populated places in Gotland County